The 2nd Lumières Awards ceremony, presented by the Académie des Lumières, was held on 13 February 1997. The ceremony was chaired by Philippe Noiret. Ridicule won three awards including Best Film,  Best Actor and Best Actress.

Winners

See also
 22nd César Awards

References

External links
 
 
 2nd Lumières Awards at AlloCiné

Lumières Awards
Lumières
Lumières